The Small Constitution of 1947 was a temporary constitution issued by the communist-dominated Sejm (Polish parliament) on 19 February 1947. It confirmed the practice of separation of powers and strengthened the Sejm. It was renewed in 1949, 1950, and 1951. It recognized some articles of the March Constitution of Poland (1921) and the PKWN Manifesto (1944), whereas the April Constitution of 1935 was not recognized. The Small Constitution was replaced in 1952 by the Constitution of the Polish People's Republic.

References

External links
  Original text at the Sejm website

1947 in law
1947 in Poland
Constitutions of Poland
Defunct constitutions
Polish People's Republic
Legal history of Poland
1947 documents